Klaus Müllen (born 2 January 1947) is a German chemist working in the fields of polymer chemistry, supramolecular chemistry and nanotechnology. He is known for the synthesis and exploration of the properties of graphene-like nanostructures and their potential applications in organic electronics.

Early life and education 
Müllen was born in Cologne. He studied chemistry there and was awarded a PhD in 1971 under the supervision of Fabian Gerson at the University of Basel. He specialized in electron spin resonance spectroscopy and his dissertation was on nuclear resonance and electron spin resonance spectroscopic studies on bridged annulenes. He then completed post-doctoral studies at the ETH Zurich under Jean François Michel Oth (1926–2003) and received his habilitation in 1977 with a thesis on dynamic NMR spectroscopy and electrochemistry.

Research career 
In 1979 he became professor of organic chemistry at the University of Cologne, in 1983 he went to the University of Mainz as a professor. Since 1989 he has been director and scientific member of the Max Planck Institute for Polymer Research. In 2016 he became emeritus. Since 1995 he has been honorary professor at the University of Mainz and at the Gutenberg Research College of the University of Mainz.

His research interests are in the field of preparative macro- and supramolecular chemistry. Among other things, his group has succeeded in synthesizing and characterizing hitherto unattainable large polycyclic aromatics such as superphenalene, which has a molecular mass of 1182 g·mol−1 and consists of 34 condensed benzene rings. 
 
He has developed small disc-like organic building blocks using alkyl-substituted hexabenzocoronene, and in particular HBC-C12 – which self-assembles into crystalline liquid-phase structures (columnar liquid crystals) as potential organic field-effect transistors. The considered two-dimensional benzene ring structures are examples of subunits of graphene lattices (graphene nanostructures). The graphene-like structures synthesized and investigated by Müllen include two-dimensional bands of less than 50 nanometers width with jagged edges. Of interest here are the electronic conduction properties and spintronics properties with a view to future replacement of silicon-semiconductor technology. In synthesis, he introduced a new method in graphene polymer chemistry: soft-landing mass spectrometry. Applications include synthetic light-emitting organic materials (such as OLEDs) and incorporation of molecular defects (defect engineering) organic analogues of semiconductor technology.

Selected awards and honorary posts 
 2001: Honorary Doctorate, University of Sofia
 2010: Honorary Doctorate, Karlsruhe Institute of Technology
 2013: Member of the American Academy of Arts and Sciences
 2016: Honorary Professor, Beijing University of Chemical Technology
 2017: Member of the Academia Europaea
 2017:  (shared with Xinliang Feng)

Selected publications 
 Books
 K. Müllen: Kernresonanz- und elektronenspinresonanzspektroskopische Untersuchungen an überbrückten Annulenen, Dissertation, Basel 1971
 
 

 Articles

References

External links
 
 
 

1947 births
Living people
Presidents of the German Chemical Society
20th-century German chemists
21st-century German chemists
University of Cologne alumni
University of Basel alumni
Academic staff of Johannes Gutenberg University Mainz
Max Planck Institute for Polymer Research people
Max Planck Institute directors